The 1984 World Juniors Track Cycling Championships were the tenth annual Junior World Championships for track cycling held in Beuvron, France in August 1984.

The Championships had five events for men only: Sprint, Points race, Individual pursuit, Team pursuit and 1 kilometre time trial.

Events

Medal table

References

UCI Juniors Track World Championships
1984 in track cycling
1984 in French sport